Biological processes are those processes that are vital for an organism to live, and that shape its capacities for interacting with its environment. Biological processes are made of many chemical reactions or other events that are involved in the persistence and transformation of life forms. Metabolism and homeostasis are examples.

Biological processes within an organism can also work as bioindicators. Scientists are able to look at an individual's biological processes to monitor the effects of environmental changes.

Regulation of biological processes occurs when any process is modulated in its frequency, rate or extent. Biological processes are regulated by many means; examples include the control of gene expression, protein modification or interaction with a protein or substrate molecule.
 Homeostasis: regulation of the internal environment to maintain a constant state; for example, sweating to reduce temperature
 Organization: being structurally composed of one or more cells – the basic units of life
 Metabolism: transformation of energy by converting chemicals and energy into cellular components (anabolism) and decomposing organic matter (catabolism). Living things require energy to maintain internal organization (homeostasis) and to produce the other phenomena associated with life.
 Growth: maintenance of a higher rate of anabolism than catabolism. A growing organism increases in size in all of its parts, rather than simply accumulating matter.
 Response to stimuli: a response can take many forms, from the contraction of a unicellular organism to external chemicals, to complex reactions involving all the senses of multicellular organisms. A response is often expressed by motion; for example, the leaves of a plant turning toward the sun (phototropism), and chemotaxis.
 Reproduction: the ability to produce new individual organisms, either asexually from a single parent organism or sexually from two parent organisms.
 Interaction between organisms. the processes by which an organism has an observable effect on another organism of the same or different species.
 Also: cellular differentiation, fermentation, fertilisation, germination, tropism, hybridisation, metamorphosis, morphogenesis, photosynthesis, transpiration.

See also
 Chemical process
 Life
 Organic reaction

References 

 
Biological concepts